Sripuria, also spelled as Sreepuria, is a locality of the city of Tinsukia, Assam, India.

Cities and towns in Tinsukia district